General Hammond may refer to:

Arthur Verney Hammond (1892–1982), British Indian Army major general
Creed C. Hammond (1874–1940), U.S. Army major general
Jeffery Hammond (born 1959), U.S. Army major general
Scott A. Hammond (fl. 1980s–2000s), Georgia Air National Guard major general
William A. Hammond (1828–1900), Union Army brigadier general

Fictional characters
George Hammond (Stargate), a fictional U.S. Air Force lieutenant general in Stargate media.
 General Hamilton Hartington Hammond, a fictional brigadier general in the novel MASH: A Novel About Three Army Doctors

See also
Attorney General Hammond (disambiguation)